Jordan Kevin Williams (born 16 October 1995) is a British professional basketball player for Hübner Nyíregyháza BS of the Nemzeti Bajnokság I/A, the top league in Hungary.

Professional career 
In 2013, Williams joined Belgian semi-professional team Duva Oostende aged 17. He spent two seasons with the team, earning promotion to the second tier in his first season and later turning professional with the club. In 2015, he joined league rivals Oostkamp but made two brief appearances before returning to England.

In January 2016, Williams joined British Basketball League team the Surrey Scorchers. In his first season with the Scorchers, he averaged 10.3 points, 2.0 assists, 7.9 rebounds and 0.5 steals per game.

He returned to the club for the 2016–17 campaign, and averaged 7.8 points, 2.6 assists, 8.0 rebounds and 0.6 steals over 16 games. Williams began the 2017–18 season in Germany with BG Eisbaeren, but re-signed for the Scorchers in November.

In August 2018, Williams committed to the Scorchers for a fourth consecutive season. Having featured in every Scorchers season, Williams became the club's second highest appearance maker.

On 23 August 2019, Williams signed with Worcester Wolves. On 15 July 2021, he signed with the London Lions.

References 

1995 births
Living people
British Basketball League players
British expatriate basketball people in Belgium
British expatriate basketball people in Germany
British men's basketball players
English expatriate sportspeople in Austria
English expatriate sportspeople in Belgium
Forwards (basketball)
London Lions (basketball) players
Surrey Scorchers players
Worcester Wolves players